is a Japanese manga series written by An Yoshimura and illustrated by Nakano Yayoi.  The series tells the story of an idol singer/martial artist and the chaos that results from her efforts to have a life and love beyond her singing career. An anime adaptation by Studio Kikan aired as part of the anthology program Eisei Anime Gekijō which was broadcast on NHK.

Synopsis
Shiratori Nagisa is the heir to a judo training hall that has fallen on such hard times that their only pupils are animals from a nearby wildlife park. In a desperate bit to save her heritage, she reveals that she is going to go out into the world as an idol singer and find "strong people" to join her school. The first part of her plan succeeds beyond her wildest dreams: she is almost instantly elevated to the status of Japan's top idol despite an utter lack of anything even remotely resembling musical talent. Yet this dooms the second part of her plan, because her fame and schedule prevent her from finding the disciples she seeks.

So Nagisa horrifies her manager by chopping off her trademark pigtails and enrolling at one of the worst schools in Tokyo as a boy, under her given name of Ootori Nagisa (Shiratori is a stage name). There she runs into the toughest gang at the school, and after she soundly beats them they (believing her to be a man) recruit her to help them confront a gang from a rival school. Unfortunately, when she sees the leader of the rival gang, a handsome boy named Nosaka-kun, she instantly falls madly in love with him. Before the fight can begin, Nagisa is whisked away to a record signing, where she encounters Nosaka again, who is so utterly smitten with Nagisa Shiratori that he proposes marriage on the spot.

The next day the disguised Nagisa fights an inconclusive duel with Nosaka that ends in a stalemate, and with Nosaka declaring her a worthy foe he looks forward to fighting again. He later reveals to the female Nagisa that he too in on a quest to recruit disciples for a failing martial arts school, and is meeting with a similar lack of success. The next day, in their final confrontation, Nosaka discovers Nagisa's secret due to an ill-placed grab maneuver. Declaring he would rather love Nagisa than fight her, he agrees to keep her secret and they run off, with the school toughs and both their disapproving fathers in hot pursuit.

After that, Nagisa continues her double life, showing up at school some of the time when her manager cannot force her to attend to her idol responsibilities. Meanwhile, the world she lives in gets weirder and weirder, as more and more bizarre things happen in her proximity.

Characters 
Ootori/Shiratori Nagisa

Nagisa is the young, pink-pigtailed protagonist of the story. While she loves to sing and dance (and is very good as well) she says that she loves to "toss people around" more. Her strength and fighting ability are overwhelmingly large, and she uses them on both people and the wildlife she trains in her dojo. She is very ambitious and isn't afraid to go after what she wants.
Nosaka Akira

Nagisa's love interest, confidante and secret fiancé. He is quite devoted but he is impulsive and protective to a fault, despite the fact that Nagisa is in less need of protection than anyone he has ever known.
Momoko Prisila

A wealthy dilettante who is determined to become the greatest actress in the world and supplant Nagisa as the most popular idol in Japan (one of her more "rational" goals is to be more famous than Audrey Hepburn.) As part of this process, she is "building a repertoire" of roles she can assumes. At least twice an episode, Momoko can be counted upon to show up at a random time, do something incredibly bizarre, and then leave, usually being driven off in her stretch limousine by the young man who adoringly follows her everywhere to the praises of a quartet of identical cheerleaders who might be robots. There are strong hints that she may have the power to literally manipulate and warp reality at will through her method acting.
Kumakichi
A large blue bear who is one of Nagisa's best friends from her dojo, who now lives with her in Tokyo and occasionally takes part in her act. Contrary to anime-fan expectations, Kumakichi actually is a bear and is usually incapable of speech.
Makoto Naketake

Nagisa's long-suffering manager who fears that her irresponsibility is going to cost him his job. He poses as a teenage boy to enroll with Nagisa at the school so he can keep her under observation, a task that usually proves futile. Even though he continues to remain in the idol agency's employ, he continues to worry about it to extreme lengths, even developing a song of his own called "The Worry Blues" as a running gag.
Tsunoda
The leader of the hoodlums at Nagisa's school, an ardent fan of Nagisa the idol singer, and a combination friend and antagonist for Nagisa the martial artist. He is bald, with a head shaped like a volcano that erupts on occasion, as a result of a childhood accident. Despite his rough appearance and speech, he is from a rich family and is surprisingly intelligent and resourceful. He is completely unable to decipher Nagisa's secret despite the fact that she does a poor job of impersonating a male. As a result of this, he completely misinterprets her relationship with his bitter rival Nosaka. Like Nosaka, he is very protective of Nagisa Shiratori and will attempt to charge to the rescue if he believes she is in danger.
Red Beetle
An international agency/conspiracy that keeps an iron grip on the market for idols on every nation on Earth except Japan. They frequently send rivals forth to break Nagisa's grip on the hearts of the Japanese public, who always fail despite Nagisa's lack of interest in defending her position on top.
Kamioka Ryuu

The Alligators of Tokyo
A group of juvenile alligators who have somehow managed to become the pets of most of Japan's female idol community. Nagisa becomes involved with them and is persuaded to stage a Benefit concert to return them to their native habitat in Florida, much to the chagrin of the gators, who find themselves outmatched in the wild and return to Tokyo.

Episodes
All but the last episode aired in 1994:
Born! Fighting Idol?! aired April 5
Duel! Thunder of Love aired April 12
Nagisa’s Date! aired April 19
You Might as Well Give up! The Revenge! aired April 26
He is a Teacher aired May 3
Pretty Girl Flower Group aired May 10
Please, Cupid of Love! aired May 17
Under the Giant Cherry Tree aired May 24
The Beautiful Girl Team is Here aired May 31
Photo! This is Nagisa! aired June 7
Idol of Japan aired June 14
I Love Wani (Alligators) aired June 28
Ah, My Former Youth aired July 5
Fun Kidnap Hong Kong Gang aired July 12
Do You Like Sexy Girls? aired July 19
Go For Your Goal aired July 26
boku no nagisa, watashi no nagisa aired August 2
shuku kaikou ! hijiri ( SENTO ) JURIANA gakuen aired August 9
Finally Here! I am Momoko aired August 16
GOGO! GOURUDO aired August 23
deta ! kagemusha, watashi wa nagisa ? aired August 30
arashi no kagaijugyou aired September 6
naite kudasai MOMOKO densetsu aired September 13
SUTAA tanjou ! ore wa kakuda da ! aired September 20
Nagisa's Mysterious Country aired September 27
hana no o-edo no SHINDERERA aired October 4
THE MUUBII . AIDORU wa mou shinde iru ! aired October 11
THE TAKOYAKI ! aired October 18
KOARAMASUKU . RITAANZU aired October 25
Nagisa of Two!? aired November 1
ai wa niji no kanata ni aired November 8
ansatsushirei wo anata ni aired November 15
kaze to tomo ni tsubureta ( zenpen ) aired November 22
kaze to tomo ni tsubureta ( kouhen ) aired November 29
Peter Pan Syndrome aired December 6
Super World Idol Legend Part-time 1 aired December 13 
Super World Idol Legend Part-time 2 aired December 20
Super World Idol Legend Part-time 3 aired December 27
Last of Idol aired January 3

Music
Opening
Third Love

Sang by Junko Inoue
Lyrics by Ayuko Ishikawa
Composed by Hiroshi Sakamoto

Ending
Ushinaenaino (I can't lose you)

Sang by Junko Inoue
Lyrics by Ayuko Ishikawa
Composed by Hiroshi Sakamoto

Song Inserts

Chō kuse ni narisō (I'll make a habit)
 
Sang by Chinami Nakamura
Lyrics by Tetsuya Endo
Composed by Hiroshi Sakamoto

Suki ni nattara saikyō (If You Love Me The Strongest)

Sang by Chinami Nakamura
Lyrics by Tetsuya Endo
Composed by Hiroshi Sakamoto

Nagisa no serenāde

Sang by Chinami Nakamura
Lyrics by Tetsuya Endo
Composed by Hiroshi Sakamoto

Yume no fūsen (Dream Balloons)

Sang by Chinami Nakamura
Lyrics by Tetsuya Endo
Composed by Hiroshi Sakamoto

Albums

All albums were released by King Records.

Chō Kuse Ni Narisō Shiratori Nagisa ON STAGE 
Released on December 21, 1994, KICA-223 BUY

Chō Kuse Ni Narisō Secret story 
Released on February 22, 1995, KICA-231 BUY

References

External links
 All Cinema entry on Chou Kuse ni Narisou

1993 manga
1994 anime television series debuts
Cross-dressing in anime and manga
Japanese idols in anime and manga
Kodansha manga
Romantic comedy anime and manga
Shōjo manga
Studio Signpost